Balwant Moreshwar Purandare (29 July 1922 – 15 November 2021), popularly known as  Babasaheb Purandare, was an Indian historian and theatre personality from Maharashtra, India. He was awarded the Padma Vibhushan, India's highest second-civilian award on 25 January 2019. His works are mostly based on the events related to the life of Shivaji maharaj, the 17th-century founder of the Maratha Empire; as a result he is termed as Shiv-Shahir ("Shivaji's bard"). He is mostly known for his popular play on Shivaji, Jaanta Raja which was popular not only in Maharashtra but also in Andhra Pradesh and Goa.  Babashaeb Purandare has also studied the history of the Peshwas of Pune. He is also known for his significant contribution along with Madhav Deshpande and Madhav Mehere as senior party leaders in the early-1970s of Shiv Sena along with Balasaheb Thackeray. In 2015, he was awarded the Maharashtra Bhushan Award, Maharashtra's highest civilian award.

Works

Purandare had started writing stories related to the period of Shivaji's reign at a very young age, which were later compiled and published in a book titled "Thinagya" ("Sparks"). His other works include books titled Raja Shiva-Chatrapati and Kesari, and a book on life of Narayanrao Peshwa. But the most well-known of his works is the drama, Jaanata Raja, a widely popular play on Shivaji published and first staged in 1985. Since then the drama has been staged over 1000 times in 16 districts of Maharashtra, Agra, Delhi, Bhopal, and the United States. Originally written in Marathi, this work was later translated into Hindi. This drama is performed by over 200 artists, as well as elephants, camels and horses. Generally the performance of this drama begins around Diwali each year.

For his works, in the field of drama, he was awarded the Kalidas Samman by the Madhya Pradesh government for the year 2007–08.

Personal life
He belonged to the Noted Deshastha Rigvedi Purandare Family.  He married Nirmala Purandare. His wife Nirmala Purandare (1933–2019) was a veteran social activist. She founded Vanasthali organisation in Pune. She was known for working amongst rural women, and in the area of child development. Her brother, Shree Ga Majgaonkar, and Babasaheb Purandare had very close association in the field of literature. Babasaheb Purandare has a daughter (Madhuri) and two sons, Amrut and Prasad. All his children are active in Marathi literary field. Madhuri Purandare, his daughter, is a renowned writer, painter, and singer.

Purandare died from pneumonia on 15 November 2021, at the age of 99 in a hospital in Pune.

Criticism
Political workers that had been protesting against Babasaheb Purandare alleged that he has sullied the reputation of Maratha warrior-king Shivaji through his writings. They also filed a PIL in the Bombay High Court, in protest when the Maharashtra government decided to award Maharashtra Bhushan to the writer. However, the Bombay High Court, dismissed the PIL, calling it a "publicity stunt", ruled that the petition lacked "substance" and fined the petitioners Rs 10,000 for wasting the court's time.

In popular culture 
 A 2008 TV show,'Raja Shivchatrapati' depicting the life of Maratha king Chhatrapati Shivaji Maharaj, was based on 'Raja Shivchatrapati ', a novel written by Babasaheb Purandare.

References

1922 births
2021 deaths
20th-century Indian historians
Historians of India
Marathi-language writers
Recipients of the Maharashtra Bhushan Award
Recipients of the Padma Vibhushan in arts
Writers from Maharashtra
Writers from Pune
Deaths from pneumonia in India